Climate change in California has resulted in higher than average temperatures, leading to increased occurrences of drought and wildfires. During the next few decades in California, climate change is likely to further reduce water availability, increase wildfire risk, decrease agricultural productivity, and threaten coastal ecosystems. The state will also be impacted economically due to the rising cost of providing water to its residents along with revenue and job loss in the agricultural sector.  California has taken a number of steps to mitigate impacts of climate change in the state.

Paleoclimatological evidence
Paleoclimatological studies indicate that the last 150 years of California's history have been unusually wet compared to the previous 2000 years. Tree stumps found at the bottom of lakes and rivers in California indicate that many water features dried up during historical dry periods, allowing trees to grow there while the water was absent. These dry periods were associated with warm periods in Earth's history. During the Medieval Warm Period, there were at least two century-long megadroughts with only 60-70% of modern precipitation levels. Paleoclimatologists believe that higher temperatures due to global warming may cause California to enter another dry period, with significantly lower precipitation and snowpack levels than observed over the last 150 years.

Extreme weather impacts
A 2011 study projected that the frequency and magnitude of both maximum and minimum temperatures would increase significantly as a result of global warming. The same study further projected that the frequency and magnitude of both maximum and minimum temperatures would likely increase as a result of global warming.

Wildfires 

In 2017, a study projected that the single largest threat to Los Angeles County hospitals related to climate change is the direct impact of the expected increase in wildfires. In Los Angeles County, 34% of hospitals are located within one mile of fire hazard severity zones. Additionally, one of these hospitals was also deemed in danger of coastal flooding due to the effects of climate change as concluded by the study. This latter issue was also included and focused on, as the study likewise concluded that this would become a greater hazard as sea level rise due to increase annual temperatures.

As a consequence of further global warming, it is projected that there will be an increase in risk due to climate-driven wildfires in the coming decades. Because of warming, frequent droughts, and the legacy of past land management and expansion of residential areas, both people and the ecology are more vulnerable to wildfires. Wildfire activity is closely tied to temperature and drought over time. Globally, the length of the fire season increased by nearly 19% from 1979 to 2013, with significantly longer seasons in the western states. Since 1985, more than 50% of the wildfire area burned in the western United States can be attributed to anthropogenic climate change.  In addition, due to human fire suppression methods, there is a build of fuels in some ecosystems, making them more vulnerable to wildfires. There is greater risk of fires occurring in denser, dryer forests, where historically these fires have occurred in low-density areas. Lastly, with increases in human population, communities have expanded into areas that are at higher risk to wildfire threat, making these same populations more vulnerable to structural damage and death due to wildfires. Since 1990, the average annual number of homes lost to wildfires has increased by 300%. Almost 900,000 of western US residences were in high risk wildfire areas as of 2017 with nearly 35% of wildfires in California starting within these high risk areas.

In 2019, after "red flag" warning about the possibility of wildfires was declared in some areas of California, the electricity company "Pacific Gas and Electric (PG&E)" begun to shut down power, for preventing inflammation of trees that touch the electricity lines. Millions can be impacted. The climatic conditions that cause this warning became more frequent because of climate change. If the temperatures keep rising, such power outages could become common.

Recent wildfire seasons have broken number of records. The 2018 season became the deadliest and most destructive in the state's history, with 103 people killed and 24,226 buildings damaged or destroyed. The 2020 season became the largest in the state's recorded history in terms of area burned, with more than 4 million acres burned across the state in 9,917 wildfires. Out of six of the biggest fires ever recorded in the state of California, five took place in 2020.

Drought 

In February 2022 researchers described the drought in the southwest of the USA, including California, in the years 2000 - 2021 as the most severe in 1,200 years "which is as far back as the data goes." Without climate change, the drought was probably finished already in 2005. 42% of its severity is due to temperature rise as a result of climate change. 88% of the area was drought-stricken. The flow of the Colorado river supplying water to 7 states had "shrank to the lowest two-year average in more than a century of record keeping." If the temperature rise will continue the drought will become worse.

According to the NOAA Drought Task Force report of 2014, the drought is not part of a long-term change in precipitation and was a symptom of the natural variability, although the record-high temperature that accompanied the recent drought may have been amplified due to human-induced global warming. This was confirmed by a 2015 scientific study which estimated that global warming "accounted for 8–27% of the observed drought anomaly in 2012–2014... Although natural variability dominates, anthropogenic warming has substantially increased the overall likelihood of extreme California droughts." A study published in 2016 found that the net effect of climate change has made agricultural droughts less likely, with the authors stating that "Our results indicate that the current severe impacts of drought on California’s agricultural sector, its forests, and other plant ecosystems have not been substantially caused by long-term climate change."

In February 2014, the Californian drought effects caused the California Department of Water Resources to develop plans for a temporary reduction of water allocations to farmland by up to 50% at the time. During that period California's 38 million residents experienced 13 consecutive months of drought. This is particularly an issue for the state's 44.7 billion dollar agricultural industry, which produces nearly half of all American-grown fruits, nuts, and vegetables. According to NASA, tests published in January 2014 have shown that the twelve months prior to January 2014 were the driest on record, since record-keeping began in 1885. Lack of water due to low snowpack prompted Californian governor Jerry Brown to order a series of stringent mandatory water restrictions on April 1, 2015.

Megafloods

Forest management 
Drought-surviving sugar pines around Lake Tahoe have been found among 129 million trees in California killed between 2012 and 2016 by drought and bark beetles. Thousands of seedlings descended from these trees are being planted south-facing slopes on the lake basin's north side with the hope that they carry genes that make them more resilient to drought, waning snowpack and other effects of global warming in the forests of Sierra Nevada.

2022 IPCC report on climate change and mitigation suggests that California land management needs to consider the changing climate when updating their forest management practices especially when considering the massive amounts of wildfires the region endures. The report suggests that prescribed burning, a popular practice in land and fire management, may not have as beneficial results and often ties adds carbon into the air furthering the problem of climate change and wildfires.

Agriculture 
Extended periods of higher temperatures are expected to increase navel orangeworm reproduction, resulting in increased insect damage to almond, walnut, and pistachio crops.

Conservation groups are partnering with farmers in Central California to flood fields for portions of the year, in order to increase habitat for species impacted by climate change, such as salmon and migratory birds.

The impact of climate change on precipitation in California can lead to the occurrence of severe drought. During droughts in California, farmers leave land fallow. In 2014 drought season, 430,000 acres of farmland were left to fallow. Farmers anticipate they will fallow a similar number of acres of farmland in 2022.

Fisheries impact 
Ocean heat waves since 2013 have delayed three Dungeness crab seasons, due to harmful algal blooms that contaminate crab meat.

Sea level rise 

A 2017 study published in the Journal of Geophysical Research projected that a sea level rise of between 1 and 2 m will swallow between one-third and two-thirds of Southern California beaches. Sea levels off the coast are projected to rise 20-55 inches over the next century.  The rise of sea levels leads to the destruction of sea life, permanent floods, and coastal erosion. According to an economic assessment done by Risky Business Project, "if current global greenhouse gas emission trends continue, between $8 billion and $10 billion of existing property in California is likely to be underwater by 2050, with an additional $6 billion to $10 billion at risk during high tide."

Health impacts 
Expected increases in extreme weather could lead to increased risk of illnesses and death. There are various diseases that will impact Californians as a result to climate change. "Exposure to wildfire smoke has been linked to health problems such as respiratory infections, cardiac arrests, low birth weight, mental health conditions, and exacerbated asthma and chronic obstructive pulmonary disease.17 Longterm exposure to wildfire smoke generated an estimated $76 billion to $136 billion per year in health costs across the continuous United States from 2008 to 2012, with some of the most significant impacts in northern California."

Heat waves 

From May to September 1999 – 2003, a study was conducted in nine Californian counties that found that for every 10 °F (5.6 °C) increase in
temperature, there is a 2.6 percent increase in cardiovascular deaths.

2006 heat wave 
A study of the 2006 Californian heat wave showed an increase of 16,166 emergency room visits, and 1,182 hospitalizations. There was also a dramatic increase in heat related illnesses; a six-fold increase in heat-related emergency room visits, and 10-fold increase in hospitalizations.

A study of seven counties impacted by the 2006 heat wave found a 9 percent increase in daily mortality per 10 degrees Fahrenheit change in apparent temperature for all counties combined. This estimate is 3 times greater than the effect estimated for the rest of the warm season. The estimates indicate that actual mortality during the 2006 heat wave was two or three times greater than the initial coroner estimate of 147 deaths.

Air pollution 

Research suggests that the majority of air pollution related health effects are caused by ozone (O3) and particulate matter (PM). Many other pollutants that are associated with climate change, such as nitrogen dioxide, sulfur dioxide, and carbon monoxide, also have health consequences.

Five of the ten most ozone-polluted metropolitan areas in the United States (Los Angeles, Bakersfield, Visalia, Fresno, and Sacramento) are in California. Californians suffer from a variety of health consequences due to air pollution – including 18,000 premature deaths attributed to various causes such as respiratory diseases as well as a number of other illnesses.

Climate change may lead to exacerbated air pollution problems. Higher temperatures catalyze chemical interactions between nitrogen
oxide, volatile organic gases and sunlight that lead to increases in ambient ozone concentrations in urban areas. A study found that for each 1 degree Celsius (1 °C) rise in temperature in the United States, there are an estimated 20–30 excess cancer cases, as well as approximately 1000 (CI: 350–1800) excess air-pollution-associated deaths. About 40 percent of the additional deaths may be due to ozone and the rest to particulate matter annually. Three hundred of these annual deaths are thought to occur in California.

Economic impacts

Gross domestic product 
The Natural Resources Defense Council (NRDC) estimates that under a business-as-usual scenario, between the years 2025 and 2100, the cost of providing water to the western states in the United States will increase from $200 billion to $950 billion per year, an estimated 0.93–1 percent of the United States' gross domestic product (GDP). Four climate change impacts—hurricane damage, energy costs, real estate losses, and water costs—alone are projected to cost 1.8 percent of the GDP of the United States, or, just under $1.9 trillion in 2008 U.S. dollars by the year 2100.

Job opportunities 
A study conducted in 2009 showed that increases in frequency and intensity of extreme weather due to climate change will lead to a decreased productivity of agriculture, revenue losses, and the potential for lay offs. Changing weather and precipitation patterns could require expensive adaptation measures, such as relocating crop cultivation, changing the composition or type of crops, and increasing inputs such as pesticides to adapt to changes in ecological composition, that lead to economic degradation and job loss. Climate change has adverse effects on agricultural productivity in California that cause laborers to be increasingly affected by job loss. For example, the two highest-value agricultural products in California's $30 billion agriculture sector are dairy products (milk and cream, valued at $3.8 billion annually) and grapes ($3.2 billion annually).  It is also expected to adversely affect the ripening of wine grapes, substantially reducing their market value.

Legislation 
California has taken a number of legislative steps and extensive measures and initiatives targeted at the broader issue of climate effects seeking  to prevent and minimize the risks of possible effects of climate change by a wide variety of incentives, measures and comprehensive plans for clean cars, renewable energy, and pollution controls on industry with overall high environmental standards. California is internationally known for its leading role in the realm of ecoconscious legislature not just on a national level but also globally.

See also 
 2012–15 North American drought
 2014 California wildfires
 2013 California wildfires
 California Air Resources Board
 California Environmental Protection Agency
 Climate change in the United States
 CoolCalifornia.org
 Effects of global warming
 Global Warming Solutions Act of 2006
 List of U.S. states and territories by carbon dioxide emissions
 Plug-in electric vehicles in California
 Pollution in California

References

Further reading 
 
 
 —this chapter of the National Climate Assessment covers Arizona, California, Colorado, New Mexico, Nevada, and Utah

External links 
 Scoping Plan
 California Center for Sustainable Energy
 California Releases Plans to Cut its Greenhouse Emissions (EERE).
 California Department of Water Resources

Legislation

 CARB about 1493.
 CARB regulations (PDF).
  AB 32 Solutions For Global Warming.
 AB 1007.
  AB 1493 (Pavley) Briefing Package (PDF) Greenhouse gas emissions.
 AB 1493 Informational Hearing (Microsoft Word file)
  AB 1493 from Governor's website, California Senate and   AB 1493 from Calcleancars.org (PDF)

Air pollution in California
California
Climate of California
Environmental issues in California
Articles containing video clips